Janič is a surname. Notable people with the surname include:

 Lukáš Janič (born 1986), Slovak football player

See also
 Janić
 Janjić

Slovak-language surnames